Paralbula is an extinct genus of prehistoric bony fish. They can be found in the Hell Creek Formation, in Montana, United States.

See also

 Prehistoric fish
 List of prehistoric bony fish

References

Prehistoric bony fish genera
Cretaceous bony fish
Late Cretaceous fish of North America
Maastrichtian life
Hell Creek fauna
Paleontology in Montana